Kenneth Judson Cochrane (4 August 1896 – 25 January 1982) was a shipbuilder, lumber merchant and political figure in Nova Scotia, Canada. He represented Cumberland in the House of Commons of Canada from 1935 to 1940 as a Liberal member and represented Cumberland in the Nova Scotia House of Assembly from 1941 to 1949 as a Liberal.

He was born in Fox River, Nova Scotia, the son of George Melville Cochrane and Sarah Soley. He was educated at the Ontario Business College in Belleville. He worked for the Canadian Bank of Commerce and as an engineer for the Nova Scotia Department of Highways. In 1917, he married Gwendolyn E. Kerr. Cochrane also served as a member of the municipal council for Port Greville in 1918. He was defeated by Percy Chapman Black when he ran for reelection to the federal seat in 1940. Cochrane served as a lieutenant in the reserves from 1943 to 1944. He died at a Truro, Nova Scotia hospital in 1982.

Electoral record

References 
 
 Canadian Parliamentary Guide, 1940, AL Normandin

1896 births
Nova Scotia Liberal Party MLAs
Liberal Party of Canada MPs
Members of the House of Commons of Canada from Nova Scotia
1982 deaths